is a Japanese manga series written and illustrated by Satoru Ozawa and serialized in Weekly Shōnen Sunday between 1963 and 1965. The manga series was adapted into two original video animations (OVA). The first OVA, titled , was produced by Knack Productions and released on 10 January 1997. The second OVA, titled , consisted of two episodes produced by Group TAC and was released between 26 September 2003 and 28 April 2004.

Plot 

In the near future, the world is at war: the USR (the Undersea Silence Revolution or the
Underwater Silence Revolution) a mysterious organization led by Admiral Red and his powerful submarine UX, wants to stop human exploitation of the seas, having  torpedoed many ships and ports. The world's navies unite and form the Peace Keeping Navy, or PKN, to fight the "terrorists". Every major UN member contributed a submarine, though the Japanese entry is an old clunker, the 707, and it is running late to the inaugural meeting. When the meeting finally begins, Admiral Red and the UX come to spoil the show with a spread of torpedoes. Arriving late in the battle, Captain Youhei Hayami steers the 707 into the way of a torpedo launched at the supercarrier that serves as the PKN's flagship. His ship is destroyed, but the flagship survives.

Six months later, Captain Hayami is given command of the salvaged and rebuilt 707, and takes a crew of old comrades and brand new cadets to sea to fight Admiral Red once more.

Characters 
Captain Yōhei Hayami Voiced by Kōsei Tomita (707); Ben Hiura (707R,Japanese); Michael Sorich (707R,English): Maritime Self-Defense Force officer.  The 707's captain.

Hayato Nango Voiced by Tōru Furusawa (707); Hiroshi Yanaka (707R,Japanese); Roy Williams (707R,English): Maritime Self-Defense Officer which through the manga series went from third to second grade officer and later became the captain of the 717

Admiral Red Terakaizo Omar : Commander of the USR and the submarine UX

Release

In 1997, an OVA was released that titled  by
Toei Doga. The "Submarine 707R" OVAs were released by Aniplex back in Sept. 26, 2003 (mission 01) and April 24, 2004 (mission 02).

References

External links 
 Official Website  (Japanese)
 

1963 manga
1997 anime OVAs
2003 anime OVAs
Aniplex
Group TAC
Knack Productions
Geneon USA
Shōnen manga
Shogakukan franchises
Shogakukan manga
Submarines in fiction